Žalgiris  may refer to:

A Lithuanian-language calque of the Polish placename Grunwald, notable for the Battle of Grunwald, known as Žalgirio mūšis ("Battle of Žalgiris") in Lithiania
 Žalgiris Kaunas (disambiguation)
 BC Žalgiris Vilnius, former name of BC Statyba, a basketball team from Vilnius, Lithuania
 FK Žalgiris Vilnius, a soccer team from Vilnius, Lithuania
 Žalgiris Arena, a multi-purpose indoor arena in Kaunas
 Žalgiris Stadium, a multi-purpose stadium in Vilnius
 Žalgiris Stadium (Klaipėda), a multi-purpose stadium in Klaipėda

See also